Robert Drumheller was an American set decorator. He was nominated for an Academy Award in the category Best Art Direction for the film The Wiz.

Selected filmography
 The Wiz (1978)

References

External links

American set decorators
Year of birth missing
1998 deaths
Emmy Award winners